Donetz may refer to:

Places
 Seversky Donets River, East European Plain
 Donetz Basin, a region in Ukraine

Ships
 SS Donetz (1924), a cargo ship in the List of shipwrecks in 1936
 SS Donetz (1937), a cargo ship

See also
 Donetsk (disambiguation)
 Donets (disambiguation)
 Dönitz (surname)